is a Japanese middle-distance runner. He was a three-time Japanese national champion in the 800 metres.

Personal best

International competition

National titles
Japanese Championships
800 m: 2000, 2002, 2003

References

External links

Hiroshi Sasano at JAAF 

1978 births
Living people
Sportspeople from Ehime Prefecture
Japanese male middle-distance runners
Asian Games competitors for Japan
Athletes (track and field) at the 2002 Asian Games
Japan Championships in Athletics winners
Ritsumeikan University alumni
20th-century Japanese people
21st-century Japanese people